Igrište may refer to:

 Igrište (Kuršumlija), a village in Serbia
 Igrište (Leskovac), a village in Serbia